Ji Qilin (born 27 May 1947) is a Chinese actor.

Biography
Ji Qilin was born in 1947 to two deployed soldiers on their way south during the Chinese Civil War. Because of the war, he grew up in his grandmother's house in Liaocheng, Shandong until the age of 5, when he and his grandmother joined his parents in Beijing. When he was 11, he was admitted to Beijing Chinese Opera School (北京戏曲学校). Two years later, his parents were relocated to Guangzhou, leaving Ji Qilin by himself in Beijing. At school, he trained to become a Peking opera wusheng performer under Hou Hailin (侯海林), a disciple of Yang Xiaolou. In 1963, after eight years of dedicated practice, Ji Qilin received a perfect score for his graduation performance, the first in school history.

Instead of becoming a star performer as everyone had predicted, Ji Qilin saw his dream dashed with the advent of the Cultural Revolution, which banned all traditional Chinese operas. In 1968, Ji Qilin was "sent down" to work in a salt mine in Tianjin. After an attempt to star in revolutionary operas proved unsuccessful, he decided to become a modern dancer. At that time, his newlywed wife Zhang Bailing (张百灵) was working as a stage actress for the Kunming Military Region (昆明军区) in Kunming, and Ji Qilin managed to join the army in Kunming to be with her. He was already 23 with no background in dancing. In order to take on non-extra roles, Ji Qilin had to work much harder than everyone else: he woke up one hour earlier and practiced until late in the evening. His dedication paid off: he was given main roles in the ballet Red Detachment of Women.

Just then the Cultural Revolution ended, and in 1978, Ji Qilin made another career change: he returned to Beijing to enroll in the China National Opera & Drama Dance Theatre so that he could star in dance dramas (舞剧), which sought to combine traditional art forms with western-imported modern dance. Again, Ji Qilin worked extremely hard and came to be recognized as one of the best dancers in China. However, by his late 30s he was increasingly battling back injuries. At that time, his young son Ji Chenmu acted in some films. Encouraged by Zhang Bailing, Ji Chenmu changed his career yet again: he followed his son and became a film and television actor.

Filmography

Film

TV and film series

References

External links

1947 births
20th-century Chinese male actors
21st-century Chinese male actors
Chinese male film actors
Chinese male television actors
Living people
Chinese male stage actors
Male actors from Beijing